State Route 81 (SR 81) is a  state highway in the central part of the U.S. state of Alabama. The southern terminus of the highway is at an intersection with US 29/US 80/SR 81 Truck in Tuskegee. The northern terminus of the highway is at an intersection with SR 14 in Notasulga.

Route description
SR 81 is a two-lane road for its entire length. In addition to connecting Tuskegee and Notasulga, it serves as a route for motorists traveling on Interstate 85 (I-85) to access the two towns. Traffic on SR 81 increases significantly when the Auburn Tigers football team is playing at Jordan–Hare Stadium. Motorists traveling from the west along I-85 can exit onto SR 81 and follow it to eastbound SR 14, which leads to Auburn.

Major intersections

Truck route

State Route 81 Truck  (SR 81 Truck) is a truck route of SR 81 in Tuskegee that travels from US 29/US 80 (SR 8/SR 15) to SR 81. The truck route travels along US 29/US 80 (East Martin Luther King Highway) from the Tuskegee Town Green to General Chappie James Drive, then turns northwest along General Chappie James Drive. North of Northeast Brothers Drive in the North Marable Subdivision, General Chappie James Drive becomes General Chappie James Avenue. After a National Guard post, it passes by the Tuskegee Airmen National Historic Site, then the entrance to Moton Field Municipal Airport before finally ending at SR 81.

See also

References

081
Transportation in Macon County, Alabama